Kinnerton is a village in Powys (historically in Radnorshire), Wales.

Kinnerton first appears in records as Kynardton in 1304, meaning "Cyneheard's farm or settlement".

References

Villages in Powys